was the forty-fifth of the sixty-nine stations of the Nakasendō connecting Edo with Kyoto in Edo period Japan. It is located in former Mino Province in what is now part of the city of Nakatsugawa, Gifu Prefecture, Japan.

History
Nakatsugawa-juku is located in mountainous terrain, with the Nakatsugawa river, a tributary of the Kiso river flowing by the post station.. In the early Edo period, the system of post stations on the Nakasendō was formalized by the Tokugawa shogunate in 1602, and it became a stopping place for traveling merchants and was also on the sankin-kōtai route used by various western daimyō to-and-from the Shogun's court in Edo.  Nakatsugawa-juku is 335.1 kilometers from Edo.  

It was part of the holdings of Owari Domain and had an assessed kokudaka of 1334 koku. The local speciality of the post station was kurikinton, a sweet delicacy based on a sweet chestnut cream.

The post station is relatively well-preserved, with a number of historical artifacts and buildings, including some machiya and a sake brewery. The waki-honjin. built in 1803. is now the local post office.  There is a stone monument with a haiku written by Matsuo Bashō.

Nakatsugawa-juku in The Sixty-nine Stations of the Kiso Kaidō
Utagawa Hiroshige's ukiyo-e print of Nakatsugawa-juku dates from 1835 -1838. There are actually two different prints for Nakatsugawa-juku in the series, for reasons which are still unclear. One version is very rare, and it is assumed that this is the earlier version,  and that the blocks used to make it were somehow lost or damaged, and rather than attempt the recreate the same scene, Hiroshige opted to make a completely new composition. The first version is nicknamed "Retainers in the Rain", as it depicts three samurai in green cloaks and straw hats walking down the banks of the Nakatsugawa River in a downpour. Two have red backpacks and the third carries a long spear with its blade wrapped in a red cloth. In the background are the thatch-roofed buildings of the post station, with several other similarly green cloaked figures in various poses. These are presumably the vanguard of a daimyō procession preparing the depart. The second composition is nicknamed "Bridge in the Plain" and depicts people crossing a rustic bridge over a small creek. One man dressed green has already crossed and two bearers with a kago (palanquin) are preparing to follow, while a local with two buckets on a pole on his should heads in the opposite direction zigzagging access a marsh towards what appears to be a sizable town on a large river or lake. In the distance is a background of mountains

Neighboring post towns
Nakasendō
Ochiai-juku - Nakatsugawa-juku - Ōi-juku

References

External links

Hiroshige Kiso-Kaido series
Nakatsugawa-juku on Kiso Kaido Road
Gifu Nakasendo Guide
Nakatsugawa official home page

Notes

Stations of the Nakasendō
Post stations in Gifu Prefecture
Nakatsugawa, Gifu
Mino Province